Episode IV, Episode Four or Episode 4 may refer to:
 "Episode IV", a song from the album Static Prevails by Jimmy Eat World
 Star Wars (film) also known as Star Wars: Episode IV – A New Hope, a 1977 film
 Episode 4 (Ashes to Ashes)
 Episode 4 (Humans series 1)
 Episode 4 (Skins)
 Episode 4 (Primeval)
 Episode 4 (The Tudors)